The Contagious Diseases (Animals) Act 1892 (55 & 56 Vict. c. 47) was an Act of the Parliament of the United Kingdom passed by Lord Salisbury's Conservative government.

Local authorities were not making sufficient use of powers to combat animal diseases so the Act introduced central control over the slaughter of infected animals and the payment of compensation.

Notes

United Kingdom Acts of Parliament 1892